Accelerationism is a range of Marxist and reactionary ideas in critical and social theory that call for the drastic intensification of capitalist growth, technological change, infrastructure sabotage, and other social processes in order to destabilize existing systems and create radical social transformation, otherwise known as "acceleration". The term also refers to the post-Marxist idea that because of capitalism's internal contradictions and instabilities which can jeopardize its growth, the abolition of the system and its class structures could be brought about by its acceleration. Various ideas, including Gilles Deleuze and Félix Guattari's idea of deterritorialization, Jean Baudrillard's proposals for "fatal strategies", and aspects of the theoretical systems and processes developed by English philosopher, and later Dark Enlightenment commentator, Nick Land, are crucial influences on accelerationism, which aims to analyze and subsequently promote the social, economic, cultural, and libidinal forces that constitute the process of acceleration.

Accelerationism has since been taken as an ideological spectrum divided into mutually contradictory left-wing and right-wing variants. Both support the indefinite intensification of capitalism and its structures as well as the conditions for a technological singularity, a hypothetical point in time where technological growth becomes uncontrollable and irreversible.

However, the term has, in a manner strongly distinguished from original accelerationist theorists, been used by right-wing extremists such as neo-fascists, neo-Nazis, white nationalists and white supremacists to increasingly refer to an "acceleration" of racial conflict through assassinations, murders and terrorist attacks as a means to violently achieve a white ethnostate.

Background and precursors 
The term "accelerationism" was first coined by professor and author Benjamin Noys in his 2010 book The Persistence of the Negative to describe the trajectory of certain post-structuralists who embraced unorthodox Marxist and counter-Marxist overviews of capital, such as Gilles Deleuze and Félix Guattari in their 1972 book Anti-Oedipus, Jean-François Lyotard in his 1974 book Libidinal Economy and Jean Baudrillard in his 1976 book Symbolic Exchange and Death.

English alt-right theorist and writer Nick Land, commonly credited with creating and inspiring accelerationism's basic ideas and concepts, cited a number of philosophers who express anticipatory accelerationist attitudes in his 2017 essay "A Quick-and-Dirty Introduction to Accelerationism". Firstly, Friedrich Nietzsche argued in a fragment in The Will to Power that "the leveling process of European man is the great process which should not be checked: one should even accelerate it." Then, taking inspiration from this notion for Anti-Oedipus, Deleuze and Guattari speculated on an unprecedented "revolutionary path" to further perpetuate capitalism's tendencies that would later become a central idea of accelerationism:

Land also cites Karl Marx, who in his 1848 speech "On the Question of Free Trade" anticipated accelerationist principles a century before Deleuze and Guattari by describing free trade as socially destructive and fuelling class conflict, then effectively arguing for it:
Land attributes the increasing speed of the modern world, along with the associated decrease in time available to think and make decisions about its events, to unregulated capitalism and its ability to exponentially grow and self-improve, describing capitalism as "a positive feedback circuit, within which commercialization and industrialization mutually excite each other in a runaway process." He argues that the best way to deal with capitalism is to participate more in order to foster even greater exponential growth and self-improvement via creative destruction, believing such acceleration of those abilities and technological progress to be intrinsic to capitalism but impossible for non-capitalist systems, and stating that "Capital revolutionizes itself more thoroughly than any extrinsic 'revolution' possibly could."

Contemporary accelerationism 
The Cybernetic Culture Research Unit (CCRU), an experimental theory collective that existed from 1995 to 2003, included Land as well as other influential social theorists such as Mark Fisher and Sadie Plant as members. Prominent contemporary left-wing accelerationists include Nick Srnicek and Alex Williams, authors of the "Manifesto for an Accelerationist Politics"; and the Laboria Cuboniks collective, who authored the manifesto "Xenofeminism: A Politics for Alienation". For Mark Fisher, writing in 2012, "Land's withering assaults on the academic left [...] remain trenchant", although problematic since "Marxism is nothing if it is not accelerationist". Aria Dean notably synthesized the analysis of racial capitalism with accelerationism, arguing that the binary between humans, and machines and capital, is already blurred by the scars of the Atlantic slave trade. Benjamin H. Bratton's book The Stack: On Software and Sovereignty has been described as concerning accelerationist ideas, focusing on how information technology infrastructures undermine modern political geographies and proposing an open-ended "design brief". Tiziana Terranova's "Red Stack Attack!" links Bratton's stack model and left-wing accelerationism. Out of Xenofeminism grew a strand of accelerationist thought labeled "gender accelerationism," asserting that the destruction of the patriarchy and the gender binary is not just a preferred future, but an outright inevitability of capitalism's acceleration.

Left-wing accelerationism 
Left-wing accelerationism, commonly referred to as "L/Acc", is often attributed to Mark Fisher, a prior CCRU member and mentor for Srnicek and Williams. Left-wing accelerationism seeks to explore, in an orthodox and conventional manner, the ways in which modern society has the momentum to create futures that are equitable and liberatory. While both strands of accelerationist thinking remain rooted in a similar range of thinkers, left accelerationism appeared with the intent to use their ideas for the goal of achieving an egalitarian future. In response to this strand of accelerationism and its optimism for egalitarianism and liberation, which departs from prior interests in experimentation and delirium, Land rebuked its ideas in an interview with The Guardian, saying that "the notion that self-propelling technology is separable from capitalism is a deep theoretical error".

Other uses of the term 
Since "accelerationism" was coined in 2010, the term has taken on several new meanings, particularly by right-wing extremist movements and terrorist organizations, that has led the term to be sensationalized on multiple occasions. Several commentators have used the label accelerationist to describe a controversial political strategy articulated by the Slovenian philosopher, Freudo-Marxist theorist, and writer Slavoj Žižek. An example often cited of this is when, in a November 2016 interview with Channel 4 News, Žižek asserted that were he an American citizen, he would vote for former U.S. president Donald Trump as the candidate more likely to disrupt the status quo of politics in that country.

Far-right accelerationist terrorism 
In spite of its original philosophical and theoretical interests, since the late 2010s, international networks of neo-fascists, neo-Nazis, White nationalists, and White supremacists have increasingly used the term "accelerationism" to refer to right-wing extremist goals, and have been known to refer to an "acceleration" of racial conflict through violent means such as assassinations, murders, terrorist attacks and eventual societal collapse, in order to achieve the building of a White ethnostate. Far-right accelerationism has been widely considered as detrimental to public safety. The inspiration for this distinct variation is occasionally cited as American Nazi Party and National Socialist Liberation Front member James Mason's newsletter Siege, where he argued for sabotage, mass killings, and assassinations of high-profile targets to destabilize and destroy the current society, seen as a system upholding a Jewish and multicultural New World Order. His works were republished and popularized by the Iron March forum and Atomwaffen Division, right-wing extremist organizations strongly connected to various terrorist attacks, murders, and assaults. According to the Southern Poverty Law Center (SPLC), which tracks hate groups and files class action lawsuits against discriminatory organizations and entities, "on the case of white supremacists, the accelerationist set sees modern society as irredeemable and believe it should be pushed to collapse so a fascist society built on ethnonationalism can take its place. What defines white supremacist accelerationists is their belief that violence is the only way to pursue their political goals."

Brenton Harrison Tarrant, the perpetrator of the Christchurch mosque shootings that killed 51 people and injured 49 others, strongly encouraged right-wing accelerationism in a section of his manifesto titled "Destabilization and Accelerationism: Tactics". It also influenced John Timothy Earnest, the perpetrator of the Escondido mosque fire at Dar-ul-Arqam Mosque in Escondido, California; and committing the Poway synagogue shooting which resulted in one dead and three injured, and influenced Patrick Crusius, the perpetrator of the El Paso Walmart shooting that killed 23 people and injured 23 others. Tarrant and Earnest in turn influenced Juraj Krajčík, the perpetrator of the 2022 Bratislava shooting that left dead two patrons of a gay bar. Sich Battalion urged its members to buy a copy of Tarrant's manifesto, encouraging them to “get inspired” by it.

Although these right-wing extremist variants and their connected strings of terrorist attacks and murders are regarded as certainly uninformed by critical theory, which was a prime source of inspiration for Land's original ideas that led to accelerationism, Land himself became interested in the Atomwaffen-affiliated theistic Satanist organization Order of Nine Angles (ONA), that adheres to the ideology of Neo-Nazi terrorist accelerationism, describing the ONA's works as "highly-recommended" in a blog post. Since the 2010s, the political ideology and religious worldview of the Order of Nine Angles, founded by the British neo-Nazi leader David Myatt in 1974, have increasingly influenced militant neo-fascist and neo-Nazi insurgent groups associated with right-wing extremist and White supremacist international networks, most notably the Iron March forum.

Accelerationist organizations
Atomwaffen Division is a neo-Nazi terror organization found in 2013 by Brandon Russell responsible for multiple murders and mass casualty plots. Atomwaffen has been proscribed as a terror organization in United Kingdom, Canada and Australia.
The Base is a neo-Nazi, white supremacist paramilitary hate group and training network, formed in 2018 by Rinaldo Nazzaro and active in the United States, Canada, Australia, South Africa, and Europe.  it is considered a terrorist organization in Canada, Australia, New Zealand and the United Kingdom.
Combat 18 is a neo-Nazi organization that has been proscribed in Canada and Germany and is tied to the assassination of Walter Lübcke and the 2009 Vítkov arson attack.
The Manson Family was a doomsday cult, led by Charles Manson, who were responsible for the Tate–LaBianca murders, in which seven people were murdered between August 8 and August 10, 1969. Manson was a white supremacist who prophesized about a race war in which African-Americans would rise up and exterminate all white people in the United States, with him and his followers hiding in safety. Afterwards, the Family would rule over the Black population, with Manson as their "master," as he believed that Black people were not intelligent enough to govern themselves. The Tate–LaBianca murders were an attempt to bring this scenario closer to reality, with Manson believing that the killing of people who he considered "pigs" would inspire Black people to do the same.
Nordic Resistance Movement is a pan-Nordic neo-Nazi organization that adheres to accelerationism and is tied to ONA and multiple terror plots and murders, like the murder of an antifascist in Helsinki in 2016. There has been an international effort to proscribe NRM as a terrorist organization, and it was banned as such in Finland in 2019.
Order of Nine Angles is a neo-Nazi satanist organization that has been connected to multiple murders and terror plots. There has been an international effort to proscribe ONA as a terror organization. Further, the ONA is connected to the Atomwaffen and the Base and the founder of ONA David Myatt was one-time leader of the C18.
Russian Imperial Movement is a white supremacist organization found in Russia and proscribed as a terror organization in United States and Canada for its connection to neo-fascist terrorists. People trained by RIM have gone on to commit a series of bombings and joined the separatist militants in Donbass.

See also 
 Accelerating change
 Eschaton
 Fail-fast
 Futurism
 Great Acceleration
 Non-simultaneity
 Speculative realism
 Strategy of tension
 Terrorgram
 Time–space compression

References

Further reading

Books

Articles 
 
 
 
  .
 
 
 
 
 

 
2010s neologisms
Anti-capitalism
Anti-fascism
Continental philosophy
Far-left politics
Far-right terrorism
Ideologies of capitalism
Marxism
Neo-Nazism
Reactionary
Revolution terminology
Singularitarianism
Social theories
Social change
Transhumanism